Samuel VanVoorhis Cooper  (February 1, 1909 – August 22, 1998) was an American football tackle who played one season in the National Football League (NFL) with the Pittsburgh Pirates. He played college football at Geneva College. He attended Monongahela High School and graduated from Mars High School in Mars, Pennsylvania. After playing in the NFL, Cooper went on to become superintendent of a boys' home, a teacher, coach, and principal. He also worked at a steel company and operated a farm with his wife.

References

External links
Just Sports Stats

1909 births
1998 deaths
Players of American football from Pennsylvania
American football offensive tackles
Geneva Golden Tornadoes football players
Pittsburgh Pirates (football) players
People from Washington County, Pennsylvania